Buff is the surname of:

 Aaron Buff (1911–1994), American chair-maker
 Charlotte Buff (1753–1828), youthful acquaintance of the German polymath Goethe, who fell in love with her
 Conrad Buff II (1886–1975), Swiss-born American co-creator of illustrated children's books
 Conrad Buff III (1926–1989), American architect, son of the above
 Conrad Buff IV (born 1948), American film editor, son of the above
 Evelyn Buff-Segal (1913–2000), née Buff, American abstract expressionist painter
 George Buff (1874–1955), Dutch long-distance runner
 Joe Buff, American author of naval techno-thrillers
 Johnny Buff (1889–1955), American boxer
 Oliver Buff (born 1992), Swiss footballer
 Sebastian Buff (1828–1880), Swiss portrait painter
 Wade Buff, a member of the 1950s The Dream Weavers vocal group
 Xavier Buff (born 1971), French mathematician